Ala'ab Damanhour Stadium is a multi-use stadium in Damanhour, Egypt.  It is used mostly for football matches, on club level by Ala'ab Damanhour. The stadium has a capacity of 8,000 spectators. It also hosted three matches during the 1974 African Cup of Nations.

References

Football venues in Egypt